The Australian men's national under 20 ice hockey team is the national under-20 ice hockey team of Australia. The team represents Australia at the International Ice Hockey Federation's World Junior Hockey Championship Division III.

History
The men's junior team played its first game on 3 March 1983 against Romania which they lost 10 – 2. They played five other games in 1983 against Bulgaria, Hungary and Romania losing every game. The following year Australia played four games, again losing every game and achieving their largest ever loss with a21–1 defeat by Yugoslavia. Australia did not play again until 1987 where they again lost all their games. The team took a longer break, not returning to international play until 2000 where they recorded their first win against Iceland, outscoring them 8 – 4. In 2008 Australia achieved their highest winning margin with a 16 – 0 win over Bulgaria. Australia finished first in the 2010 World Junior Ice Hockey Championships - Division III tournament and gained promotion to Division II of the 2011 tournament.

International competitions

World Junior Championships

References

External links
Ice Hockey Australia
National Teams of Ice Hockey

Ice hockey
Junior national ice hockey teams